The 1958 West Virginia Mountaineers football team represented West Virginia University as a member of the Southern Conference (SoCon) during the 1958 NCAA University Division football season. Led by ninth-year head coach Art Lewis, the Mountaineers compiled an overall record of 4–5–1 with a mark of 4–0 in conference play, winning the SoCon title for the fifth time in six seasons.

Schedule

References

West Virginia
West Virginia Mountaineers football seasons
Southern Conference football champion seasons
West Virginia Mountaineers football